Type II keratins (or Type II cytokeratins) constitutes the Type II intermediate filaments (IFs) of the intracytoplasmatic cytoskeleton, which is present in all mammalian epithelial cells. The type 2 cytokeratins consist of basic or neutral, high molecular weight proteins which in vivo are arranged in pairs of heterotypic Type I and Type II keratin chains, coexpressed during differentiation of simple and stratified epithelial tissues.

Type II cytokeratins are encoded on chromosome 12q and encompasses: CK1, CK2, CK3, CK4, CK5, CK6, CK7 and CK8. Their molecular weight ranges from 52 kDa (CK8) to 67 kDa (CK18).

See also
Type I keratin

External links
 
 Proteopedia page on keratins

Keratins